De Mercado is a Spanish  surname. It is believed to have first appeared around the Spanish provinces of Segovia and Valladolid. Its roots are most likely in Old Castile or Andalusia. Some variants of the name are Mercado, Mercaddo, Meradoo, Mercados, Mercadors, Mercadons, de Mercado, deMercado, Demercado, and DeMercado. The name means 'market' in Spanish and goes back to Latin mercatus, with the same meaning. Although not a Portuguese surname, the de Mercado name can also be found in Portugal to a limited extent, as it was brought over there from Spain generations ago. Some of the first settlers of this family name or some of its variants were among the early explorers of the New World were many who settled in the Caribbean and Central America. They included Gutierre De Mercado who came to the Spanish Main in 1534 and Gabriel de Mercado who arrived in New Spain in 1578. The name was brought into England in the wake of the Norman Invasion of 1066, and Roger Marcand, recorded in the year 1202 in County Berkshire, appears to be the first of the name on record. Roger Mauchaunt appears in Yorkshire in 1219, and Ranulph le Marchand was documented in 1240 in County Essex. The associated coat of arms is recorded in Cronistas Reyes de Armas de España. The heraldic office dates back to the 16th century. They have judicial powers in matters of nobiliary titles, and also serve as a registration office for pedigrees and grants of arms.

Mercado is also a Sephardic name given to or assumed by someone who had escaped some great danger or recovered from a life-threatening illness; he was 'bought' or taken under the protection of a relative or friend and had his name changed to Merkado to confuse the Angel of Death, who, it was believed, would make further attempts to take the life of which he had been baulked.

Some well-known (de) Mercados
Sir Frederick Johann Mercado, Libertarian politician, criminal justice reform advocate, polymath
Arturo Mercado, Mexican voice actor
Bernardo Mercado, Colombian heavy-weight boxer
César Mercado, Puerto Rican marathon runner
Diego Fernández de Mercado, Spanish governor of Jamaica in 1586 (during Spanish rule)
Emiliano Mercado del Toro, Puerto Rican centenarian whom, at his death, was the  world's oldest living person
José Protacio Rizal Mercado y Alonso Realonda popularly known as Dr. Jose Rizal, National Hero of the Philippines
Orlando Mercado, Puerto Rican baseball player
Orlando S. Mercado also known as Orly Mercado, Philippine politician and journalist
Oscar Mercado, Colombian-American baseball player
Sergio Ramírez Mercado, Nicaraguan writer and intellectual
Syesha Mercado, American singer
Walter Mercado also known as Shanti Ananda, Puerto Rican astrologer

See also
 Spanish naming customs
Puerto Rican rock music#1950s and 1960s

External links
Hispanic Heraldry (in Spanish) – Information about Hispanic surnames.
 History of the de Mercado surname (in Spanish)
 A Jamaican branch of the family (from Spain via Netherlands)

References